Nicolás Sebastián Canales Calas (born 27 June 1985) is a Chilean former professional footballer who plays for as a striker.

Club career

Early career
Canales debuted with Universidad de Chile where he won the Apertura in 2004 and reached the final of the Clausura in 2005.

He scored five goals in nine matches in the Liga de Honra while playing for Benfica B.

On 1 August 2007, he signed with Romanian squad CFR Cluj by £450.000. However his time there was short, because at the beginning of 2008 Canales returned to Chile to play for Unión Española.

Palestino
In 2010, he was transferred to Palestino where he scored 34 times in 73 appearances. Their great performances give him the opportunity to play internationally with the Chile national football team.

Neftchi Baku
In June 2012, he signed for Neftchi Baku of the Azerbaijan Premier League in a one-year deal. He played his first game for Neftchi in a friendly against Dinamo București. He made his competitive debut in a UEFA Champions League fixture against Zestafoni on 17 July. He scored the third goal of the 3–0 home victory. In the 2012–13 season, he played in 31 games and scored 26 goals, helping his team win the league and becoming the top goalscorer of the championship. He also won the Azerbaijan Cup in the 2012–13 edition playing five games and scoring one goal in the competition.

Colo-Colo
On 13 August 2013, he signed for Colo-Colo of the Chilean Primera División in a one-year deal.

Return to Neftchi Baku
On 14 August 2014, Canales resigned for Neftchi Baku on a one-year contract, with the option of a second year.

Krylia Sovetov
In September 2015, Canales signed a one-year contract with FC Krylia Sovetov Samara of the Russian Premier League. After playing several games for the Under-21 squad and failing to make a single appearance in the Premier League, Canales has been released from his contract by Krylia Sovetov on 7 December 2015.

Second return to Neftchi Baku
In February 2016 Canales returned to Neftchi Baku for a third stint at the club. After six-months with Neftçi Baku, scoring once in nine games, Canales left Neftçi Baku in June 2016.

Okzhetpes
On 5 July 2016, Canales signed with FC Okzhetpes until the end of the 2016 season.

Deportes Temuco
On 11 January 2017, Canales signed for Deportes Temuco.

International career
Canales made his senior international debut in the 2–0 defeat by Paraguay on 15 February 2012. He also participated in the U-20 2005 Sudamericano in Colombia. He went on to later play at the 2005 U-20 World Cup in the Netherlands.

Career statistics

Club

International

After football
Since 2021, Canales has a company called Nibec focused on products for storehouses and industrial organization.

Honours

Club
Universidad de Chile
 Primera División de Chile: 2004 Apertura

Neftchi Baku
Azerbaijan Premier League: 2012–13
Azerbaijan Cup: 2012–13
Individual
Azerbaijan Premier League top scorer: 2012–13

References

External links
 
 

1985 births
Living people
Chilean footballers
Association football forwards
Chile international footballers
Chile under-20 international footballers
Chilean Primera División players
Liga Portugal 2 players
Liga I players
Azerbaijan Premier League players
Russian Premier League players
Kazakhstan Premier League players
Primera B de Chile players
Universidad de Chile footballers
S.L. Benfica B players
Gondomar S.C. players
CFR Cluj players
Unión Española footballers
Cobresal footballers
Club Deportivo Palestino footballers
Neftçi PFK players
Colo-Colo footballers
Santiago Wanderers footballers
PFC Krylia Sovetov Samara players
FC Okzhetpes players
Deportes Temuco footballers
Rangers de Talca footballers
Chilean expatriate footballers
Chilean expatriate sportspeople in Portugal
Expatriate footballers in Portugal
Chilean expatriate sportspeople in Romania
Expatriate footballers in Romania
Chilean expatriate sportspeople in Azerbaijan
Expatriate footballers in Azerbaijan
Chilean expatriate sportspeople in Russia
Expatriate footballers in Russia
Chilean expatriate sportspeople in Kazakhstan
Expatriate footballers in Kazakhstan